Odartei Milla Lamptey popularly known as Gasmilla or International Fisherman, is a Ghanaian Hiplife artist. He is noted for his hit songs Aboodatoi and Telemo ft. Capasta and creating the Azonto Dance and Genre. He is an Afro-pop singer and a songwriter. He was claimed to be recognized as the Vodafone Green Ambassador.

Music career 
Gasmilla started his music career featuring artists while in Junior High school. While in senior high school, he became the first artist at Cold Eye studios. Gasmilla's first major single was "Aboodatoi".

Discovery 
When Lamptey was at the age of 7, he became seriously involved in singing influenced by his Father and he has been performing since the age of 12. He started producing his music slowly but  always progressed. At the age of 13, he decided he wanted to get serious in the music industry. His mother had gotten a boom-box with a microphone that he used in recording his rap and ragga tunes, with the help of his younger sister singing choruses, it was at the moment that he discovered his hidden talent. In high school, he was one of the prominent names in media and entertainment in Wesley Grammar School. Lamptey even emerged as the best performing artist in inter-school fiesta back in 2003. He was also one of the best rappers the University of Professional Studies. He has also worked with top producers such as Decoder, Odo Nsuo, Akwaboah, and more.

Education 
Gasmilla is an alumnus of Wesley Grammar and the University of Professional Studies.

Partnership 
In May 2021, Gasmilla partnered with AMA to promote sanitation in the city of Accra. This partnership was claimed to use his brand to educate the public and create awareness on the need to keep the city clean. Gasmilla claimed the Assembly decided to partner with him because of his previous involvement on sanitation projects.

Videography

Awards

References 

Living people
1984 births
University of Professional Studies alumni
Ghanaian musicians
Ghanaian rappers
Ghanaian hip hop musicians